You Can't Buy Love may refer to:

"You Can't Buy Love", song by Judy Collins from Portrait of an American Girl  2005 
"You Can't Buy Love", song by the rock band Angel from Sinful (album)
"You Can't Buy Love", song by Shania Twain from Now (Shania Twain album)